Stephensia calpella is a moth of the family Elachistidae. It is found in Spain and North Africa.

The wingspan is about 8 mm. The forewings are greyish brown with a slight fuscous suffusion and sparsely dotted with fuscous scales. The hindwings are brownish grey.

The larvae feed on Ballota hirsuta. They mine the leaves of their host plant. The mine has the form of a large, full depth blotch that starts at the leaf margin. The frass is deposited in irregular grains and is concentrated in the beginning of the mine. Pupation takes place inside the mine. Larvae can be found from April to May.

References

Moths described in 1908
Elachistidae
Moths of Europe
Moths of Asia